The 25th Actors and Actresses Union Awards ceremony was held on 14 March 2016 at the Circo Price in Madrid.

In addition to the competitive awards, Mabel Lozano received the '' award, Juan Margallo the '' career award and  the Special Award.

Winners and nominees 
The winners and nominees are listed as follows:

Film

Television

Theatre

Newcomers

References 

Actors and Actresses Union Awards
2016 in Madrid
2016 television awards
2016 film awards
2016 theatre awards
March 2016 events in Spain